The men's shot put event at the 2015 African Games was held on 14 September.

Results

References

Shot